The Kettle River Range, often called the Kettle Range, is the southernmost range of the Monashee Mountains, located in far southeastern British Columbia, Canada and Ferry County, Washington, in the United States. Most of the northern half of the range is protected by the Colville National Forest and the southern half of the range is located on the Colville Indian Reservation. The highest peak is Copper Butte, which reaches . The range is crossed by Washington State Route 20 at Sherman Pass.

Geography
The range runs north to south, bordered on the east by the Kettle River and the Columbia River, and on the west by the Kettle River, the Curlew Valley and the San Poil River. The mountainous region begins immediately north of the Canada–US border, at Grand Forks, British Columbia, extending 110 miles (177 km) south to the bend of the Columbia River and Lake Roosevelt, formed by Grand Coulee Dam, where it terminates. The Okanogan Highlands are adjacent to the range on the west, and the Selkirk Mountains are adjacent on the east.

The route is named for American Civil War General William Tecumseh Sherman, who crossed the range in 1883.

History

Prospectors and low-paid Chinese miners working claims in the Kettle River Range produced more than 839,000 ounces of gold between 1896 and 1959. The largest amounts came from the Republic District although 6,000 ounces of gold came from the Danville and Columbia River Districts. Terrace deposits 30 and 100 feet above the Columbia River at Keller also produced gold. Records state that during this time period, 164 lode mines, where thick mineral veins were worked with pick axes and shovels, and 35 placer mines, where minerals exposed by erosion were recovered from rivers and loose surface soil, operated in Ferry County.—From 1904 to 1928, the Kettle River Range was the largest producer of gold in the state. Mining operations yielded silver, copper, lead, zinc, platinum, nickel, cobalt, tungsten, iron, and iron pyrite ("fool’s gold"), as well.

The White Mountain wildfire burnt and destroyed 21,000 acres of timber in the southern half of the range in 1988, including all but the easternmost flanks of White Mountain, Edds Mountain, Bald Mountain, and Snow Peak, north to Sherman Peak. The State of Washington has built several interesting interpretive sites and pull-outs along roads in the region that explain the devastation.

The Kettle Complex fires occurred in late summer of 2015.  The complex included three fires – the Stickpin, Renner and Graves Mountain fires – burning south of the Canada–US border, west of Highway 395, north of State Route 20 and east of Highway 21. An estimated 73,392 acres were burned.

Today, the Kettle River Range is a popular, all-season recreation area for hiking, sport and aided climbing, snowshoeing, and cross-country skiing. The Kettle Crest National Recreation Trail follows the backbone of the range, and may be accessed at the Kettle Crest Trailhead on the north or the Deer Creek Summit South/Sno-Park Trailhead on the south.

Major summits
 Copper Butte, the highest summit in the Kettle River Range
 Snow Peak, 
 Scar Mountain, 
 Wapaloosie Mountain, 
 Sherman Peak, 
 Bald Mountain, 
 White Mountain, 
 Columbia Mountain, 
 Midnight Mountain, 
 King Mountain, 
 Edds Mountain,

See also
List of mountain ranges in Washington

References

External links
LOJ Peaks List, Ferry County, list of all significant peaks in the range
SummitPost.org, Kettle River Range (U.S.), includes photos

Monashee Mountains
Boundary Country
Landforms of Ferry County, Washington
Mountain ranges of Washington (state)